Brazzers (company name: MG Premium Ltd.) is a Canadian pornographic video production company with headquarters in Montreal, Quebec, Canada and legal domicile in Nicosia, Cyprus. With an online network consisting of thirty-one hardcore pornography websites, the company's slogan is "World's Best HD Porn Site!". The site contains 10,036 videos, which were published by 33 different sites (December 2020). Their network of sites features 2,340 pornstar models (December 2020).

History 
Founded in 2005 by a group of Montreal investors, Brazzers became part of a larger group of pornographic sites under the corporate name of Mansef. In 2010, Mansef was sold to Fabian Thylmann and rebranded as Manwin Inc. In December 2012, Thylmann was extradited from Belgium to Germany on suspicion of tax evasion.

In October 2013, Thylmann sold Manwin's assets, including Brazzers, to an internal management group, Mindgeek.

In 2014, Brazzers celebrated its 10th anniversary with a billboard in Times Square in New York City. The digital billboard was located at the corner of 47th and 7th and viewable for the entire month of August. In 2010, Brazzers had used a Times Square billboard to promote its safe sex campaign and to announce its "Get Rubber!" slogan and website.

In September 2016, Vigilante broke the news of a database breach suffered by Brazzers, which affected almost 1 million users after the site was hacked in April 2013.

Logo 
The Brazzers logo has changed a few times, however still maintaining the yellow and black coloring and placing an emphasis on the double z letters for branding.

Operations 
Brazzers is owned and operated by Mindgeek, a multinational officially registered in Luxembourg.

Brazzers came under industry criticism for associating with streaming media sites like Pornhub. In response, in 2009 the company initiated an anti-piracy campaign.

Litigation 
In 2008, after being fired, producer Bobby Manila sued Brazzers for fraud and violation of the terms of his contract. The lawsuit was eventually settled out of court.

In February 2010, Pink Visual Studio sued Brazzers' parent company, Manwin, for copyright infringement by distributing unlicensed video content on its free video-sharing sites. Brazzers' network has been accused of benefiting from unlicensed content by indirectly benefiting from traffic from sharing sites, but this was the first time a well-known studio had filed a lawsuit. A class action lawsuit was considered by other studios.

In 2018, the Government of India banned Brazzers, among other porn websites, after a Uttarakhand High Court court order demanding the same in a rape case where the perpetrators stated they were motivated to do so after watching online pornography.

Awards 
 2009 AVN Awards – Best Adult Website
 2009 AVN Award – Best New Video Production Company
 2009 AVN Award – Best Big Bust Release (Big Tits at School)
 2009 XBIZ Award – Affiliate Program of the Year
 2010 AVN Award – Best Big Bust Series (Big Tits at School)
 2011 AVN Award – Best Membership Site Network
 2011 AVN Award – Best Big Bust Series (Big Tits at School)
 2011 AVN Award – Best Vignette Release (Pornstar Punishment)
 2012 AVN Award – Best Big Bust Series
 2012 AVN Award  – Best Membership Website
 2013 XBIZ Award nominee – Vignette Release of the Year (Big Tits in Sports Vol 9 and Day With a H3R); Vignette Series of the Year (Big Tits in Sports and MILFs Like it Big); All-Girl Series of the Year (Hot and Mean)
 2014 XBIZ Award – Studio Site of the Year (Brazzers.com)
 2015 XBIZ Award – Adult Site of the Year – Multi-Genre (Brazzers.com)
 2016 XBIZ Award – Adult Site of the Year – Video (Brazzers.com)
 2016 AVN Award – Best Foreign Feature - The Doctor
 2016 AVN Award – Best Director (Foreign Feature) - Dick Bush, The Doctor
 2016 AVN Award – Best Sex Scene in a Foreign-shot Production - Victoria Summers & Danny D., The Doctor
 2017 XBIZ Award – Best Art Direction for Storm of Kings
 2018 AVN Award – Best Membership Site Network
 2019 XBIZ Award - Marketing Campaign of the Year for Brazzers House
2020 PornHub Award – Most Popular Channel

Ranking 
As of July 2021, Brazzers.com has an Alexa traffic ranking of 3,576.

References

External links 
 
 

MindGeek
Internet properties established in 2005
Canadian erotica and pornography websites
Film production companies of Canada
Canadian pornographic film studios
Mass media companies of Cyprus
Companies based in Montreal
Companies based in Nicosia
Video production companies
Internet censorship in India